Bothwell is a Scottish surname. Notable people with the surname include: 

Dorr Bothwell (1902–2000), American artist
Francis Bothwell of Edinburgh, 16th-century Scottish merchant, landowner, judge and member of the Scottish Parliament
John Bothwell (bishop) (1926–2014), Canadian Anglican bishop and writer
Robert Bothwell (born 1944), Canadian historian and writer